The Skeet River is a river of the Tasman Region of New Zealand's South Island. It flows northeast from the Wharepapa / Arthur Range, reaching the Baton River 15 kilometres northwest of Tapawera.

See also
List of rivers of New Zealand

References

Rivers of the Tasman District
Rivers of New Zealand